Jackson Koehler Eagle Brewery was a historic brewery complex located at Erie, Erie County, Pennsylvania. The original section constructed in 1891 consisted of the brewhouse with grain tower, racking room, filter room, and keg wash room.  Later additions include the storage cellar, keg receiving and storage rooms (1933, later demolished), and rathskeller (1936). The complex was constructed of brick, with Germanesque-Teutonic-style influences. A brewery was sited here as early as 1855.  It was originally begun by J Henry Kalvelage . The Eagle Brewery merged into the Erie Brewing Company in 1899. The Erie Brewing Company closed in 1978.  It was demolished in 2006.

It was added to the National Register of Historic Places in 1982.

See also
 List of defunct breweries in the United States

References

https://sites.google.com/site/koehlerbeer/

Defunct brewery companies of the United States
Industrial buildings and structures on the National Register of Historic Places in Pennsylvania
Industrial buildings completed in 1891
Buildings and structures demolished in 2006
Buildings and structures in Erie, Pennsylvania
National Register of Historic Places in Erie County, Pennsylvania